Bhavana Rao (born 6 June 1989) an Indian actress who has predominantly appeared in Kannada language films. She made her debut in the Kannada multistarrer Gaalipata (2008) winning critical acclaim for her performance, before playing leading roles in Kola Kolaya Mundhirika and Vinmeengal. She is also an accomplished Bharatanatyam dancer and has anchored for various Television programs before becoming a lead film actress. Bhavana Rao is an Indian actress, who works mainly in the South Indian film industry. She made her acting debut with Yograj Bhat's Gaalipata (2008). Over the years Bhavana has worked in Kannada and Tamil movies like Vaare Vah (2010), Vinmeengal (2012), Attahasa (2013), Krazy Star (2014), Maha Bhaktha Siriyala (2014), Parapancha (2016), Niruttara (2016), Sathyaharishchandra (2017) and Dayavittu Gamanisi (2017). In 2017 Bhavana starred alongside Sathish Ninasam and Roshni Prakash in director Ravi Srivatsa's action-drama, Tiger Galli.

Filmography
 All films are in Kannada language, unless otherwise noted

References

External links
 
 Instagram

Indian film actresses
Actresses in Tamil cinema
Living people
Actresses in Kannada cinema
People from Shimoga
Bharatanatyam exponents
Actresses from Karnataka
21st-century Indian actresses
Dancers from Karnataka
21st-century Indian dancers
1989 births